Adolf Brunner (Zurich, 25 June 1901-Thalwil, 15 February 1992) was a Swiss composer. He is best known for his conservative Markus-Passion (1971).

References

1901 births
1992 deaths
Musicians from Zürich
Swiss composers
Swiss male composers
20th-century male musicians